Aaron Dashiell is a former American football defensive back. Dashiell attended the University of Maine, where he played with the Maine Black Bears football team. He was named to the Division I-AA All American twice (1998–99), becoming at the time just Maine's second multiple time All American after John Huard. Stephen Cooper and Jovan Belcher have done it since.

During his junior season, Dashiell had 100 tackles and 6 interceptions. He is from Plainfield, New Jersey.

References

Year of birth missing (living people)
Living people
American football safeties
Maine Black Bears football players
Sportspeople from Plainfield, New Jersey
Players of American football from New Jersey